Parliamentary elections were held in Romania on 9 March 1975. The Front of Socialist Unity, dominated by the Romanian Communist Party and including other mass organisations, was the only organisation that contested the election. No prospective candidate could run for office without the Front's approval. The Front won all 349 seats in the Great National Assembly.

Electoral system 
These were the first elections held after a constitutional amendment in 1974, which reduced the number of seats in the Assembly from 465 to 349 and extended its term from four to five years. Candidates were elected in single member constituencies, and had to receive over 50% of the vote. If no candidate passed this threshold, or if voter turnout in the constituency was less than 50%, re-runs were held until the requirements were met. Voters had the option of voting against the Front candidates.

Results

References 

Parliamentary elections in Romania
Romania
Legislative
One-party elections
Romania